Anne Marit Bjørnflaten (born 18 June 1969 in Harstad) is a Norwegian politician for the Labour Party.

Between 2000 and 2001, during Stoltenberg's first cabinet, Bjørnflaten was appointed political advisor in the Ministry of Foreign Affairs. She was elected to the Norwegian Parliament from Troms in 2005. She is the leader of the justice committee in the Norwegian Parliament. She will not seek reelection to the parliament in 2013.

On the local level, Bjørnflaten was a member of the executive committee of Tromsø municipality council from 2003 to 2005. From 1991 to 1995 she was a member of Troms county council. She was a member of the Labour Party central board from 2002 to 2005.

References

1969 births
Living people
Members of the Storting
People from Harstad
Politicians from Tromsø
Labour Party (Norway) politicians
University of Tromsø alumni
University of Bergen alumni
University of Oslo alumni
Women members of the Storting
21st-century Norwegian politicians
21st-century Norwegian women politicians